This is a list of all the horse breeds in the DAD-IS, the Domestic Animal Diversity Information System, a database of the FAO. There are about 4150 horse breed entries, reported by almost 200 countries, not all of which have horses. The breed names are those held in the database, and thus reflect the diversity between the various reporting countries; intentionally, no attempt has been made to link, unify, rationalise or translate them. One spelling error has been corrected.

The list can be sorted by country, which offers no advantage over the database itself. The default sort order is alphabetical by breed, which allows the geographical range of a breed such as the Morgan to be seen. It is also text-searchable, which may help find all entries for, say, the Mérens.

Breeds in the database
The fourth version of the DAD-IS was launched on 21 November 2017 and the horse breeds listed in it were:

References 

horse breeds
Horse breeds
H